Fire and Fury: Inside the Trump White House is a 2018 book by Michael Wolff.

Fire and Fury may also refer to:

Fire and Fury (game), a tabletop game based on the American Civil War
"Fire and Fury", a song from the 2013 Skillet album Rise
Fire and Fury, the fourth novel in The Chronicles of Avantia book series 
Fire and Fury: the Allied Bombing of Germany 1942–1945, a 2008 book by Randall Hansen
Fire and Fury Records, a record label founded by Bobby Robinson
Fire and Fury Corps, also known as the XIV Corps, a division of the Indian Army